Kathryn Felice Lampard, Baroness Lampard,  (born 20 April 1960) is an English former barrister. 

She undertook a number of senior non executive roles within the National Health Service, including chairing SouthEast Coast Strategic Health Authority.  She is also a former Deputy Chairwoman of the Financial Ombudsman Service. In 2012 she was appointed by the Department of Health to oversee its investigation into the activities of the late broadcaster Jimmy Savile at Stoke Mandeville Hospital, Leeds General Infirmary, Broadmoor Hospital, and elsewhere within the National Health Service after allegations of sexual abuse by Savile.

In 2015 Lampard was appointed by Serco Plc to undertake an independent review of the circumstances surrounding allegations, made in a Channel 4 news report, of the mistreatment of detainees at Yarl's Wood Immigration Removal Centre. In 2017 she was appointed by G4S plc to undertake an independent review of the circumstances surrounding allegations, made in a BBC Panorama television programme, of the mistreatment of detainees at the Brook House Immigration Removal Centre. In 2019 the Home Secretary, Sajid Javid, appointed Lampard to lead a review of the Borders, Immigration and Citizenship service.

Lampard served as interim chair of the Independent Advisory Panel on Deaths in Custody (November 2015-June 2016). She is chair of the board of trustees at GambleAware, a trustee of the Esmee Fairbairn Foundation and a trustee of the Royal Horticultural Society.

Lampard was appointed Commander of the Order of the British Empire (CBE) in the 2015 New Year Honours for services to the National Health Service and to the community in Kent.

It was announced on 14 October 2022, that as part of the 2022 Special Honours, Lampard would be receive a life peerage, sitting for the Conservative Party. On 17 November 2022, she was created Baroness Lampard, of Frinsted in the County of Kent.

References

External links
Board members at NHS South of England

1960 births
English barristers
21st-century English lawyers
Living people
British women lawyers
Commanders of the Order of the British Empire
Conservative Party (UK) life peers
Life peers created by Charles III
Life peeresses created by Charles III